Manfredo Pietrantonio (born 4 May 1998) is an Italian football player. He plays for Sambuceto Calcio.

Club career
He made his Serie C debut for Teramo on 27 August 2017 in a game against Mestre.

In November 2019, Pietrantonio joined ASD Sambuceto Calcio.

References

External links
 

1998 births
Sportspeople from Pescara
Footballers from Abruzzo
Living people
Italian footballers
Association football defenders
S.S. Chieti Calcio players
L'Aquila Calcio 1927 players
S.S. Teramo Calcio players
Serie C players
Serie D players